Point Peter is an unincorporated community in Oglethorpe County, in the U.S. state of Georgia.

History
A post office called Point Peter was established in 1849, and remained in operation until 1957. The community was named after one " Peter", a whiskey peddler; a postal error accounts for the error in spelling, which was never corrected. Older variant names are "Glade" and "The Glade".

References

Unincorporated communities in Oglethorpe County, Georgia
Unincorporated communities in Georgia (U.S. state)